Eduardo "Ted" Robledo Oliver (26 July 1928 – 6 December 1970) was a Chilean professional football player. He played as a left-sided defender, and is most notable for his time spent with Newcastle United. He was also part of Chile's squad for the 1955 South American Championship.

Career
Robledo was born in Iquique, Chile to a Chilean father and an English mother. He emigrated with his family to Wath-on-Dearne, Yorkshire in 1932, at the age of four, due to the political instability in Chile at the time. The family lived at Barnsley Rd, West Melton, in the same house where the Anglo-French biographer David Bret was later raised.

Robledo started his footballing career at Barnsley with his brother George. First Division Newcastle United signed him on 27 January 1949. Newcastle were only interested in signing his brother, but neither of the Robledo brothers would move without the other. Their appearance together in the 1952 FA Cup Final was the first time more than one foreign player had appeared in a cup final team.

The majority of Robledo's appearances for the club came in the 1951–52 season. He played for Newcastle until the end of the 1952–53 season, when he was sold to Colo-Colo. At international level, he earned nine caps for Chile national team between 1954 and 1955. After retiring from football, he served on an oil tanker where he died in mysterious circumstances in December 1970, at the age of 42. It was rumoured that he was thrown off the tanker and drowned. His body has never been found. His brother George outlived him by nearly two decades, dying in April 1989 just before his 63rd birthday.

Honours

As a player
Newcastle United
 FA Cup winner: 1952

References

External links
 Player Profile: Eduardo Oliver 'Ted' Robledo at toon1892.co.uk

1928 births
1970 deaths
People from Iquique
Chilean footballers
Chile international footballers
Barnsley F.C. players
Newcastle United F.C. players
Colo-Colo footballers
English Football League players
Chilean Primera División players
Chilean people of English descent
Chilean emigrants to England
People who died at sea
Expatriate footballers in England
Chilean expatriate sportspeople in England
Association football midfielders
FA Cup Final players